Elaine I. Duillo (July 28, 1928 – July 30, 2021) was an American painter and illustrator known for her romance fiction book covers. She was inducted into the Society of Illustrators Hall of Fame in 2003.

Early life 
Elaine studied at the High School of Music and Art in Manhattan, where she met John Duillo, who would also go on to become an adventure illustrator and gallery painter. She graduated from Pratt Institute in Brooklyn. She began her career in 1959 illustrating adventure story magazines and gothic novels.

Career

Duillo is known for her prolific, eye-catching, realism painting for romance paperback covers. Her painting style is one of "characteristically flawless draftsmanship, evocative mood and compositional power", and uses "layer upon layer of transparent acrylic washes to achieve a luminous effect". She is credited not only with breaking through into a male-dominated field in the early 1960s, but with redefining romance art at the end of the 1970s and early 1980s, introducing more men and male nakedness into her cover art, and influencing other illustrators who followed her style. She is also credited with aiding the rise to fame of model Fabio Lanzoni when she began using him as a model, first on the cover illustration for Johanna Lindsey's Hearts Aflame. She has worked for paperback publishers including Ace, Airmont, Avon, Balcourt Art Service, Bantam, Berkley, Crescent, Dell, Fawcett Gold Medal, Lancer, Penguin USA, Playboy Press, Pocket Books, New American Library and Zebra Kensington. She retired from book cover illustration in early 2003. In her acceptance speech for her induction to the Society of Illustrators Hall of Fame, she summarized her career saying, “[T]his field has been rewarding to me and in return I’ve tried to elevate romance illustration to an art form. At least I hope I’ve been influential in changing the look of the genre… My work is mainly about creating fantasy – fantasy people, fantasy situations and fantasy settings. It is realistic, but upon closer inspection, my paintings portray a highly glamorized version of already attractive people and places that goes beyond realism.”

References

1928 births
2021 deaths
American illustrators
People from Brooklyn